Alfonso Canti (21 July 1920 – 4 June 1996) was an Italian weightlifter. He competed in the men's lightweight event at the 1952 Summer Olympics.

References

External links
 

1920 births
1996 deaths
Italian male weightlifters
Olympic weightlifters of Italy
Weightlifters at the 1952 Summer Olympics
Sportspeople from Genoa
People from Sampierdarena
20th-century Italian people